The following outline is provided as an overview of and topical guide to Wales:

Wales – a country that is part of the United Kingdom, bordered by England to its east and the Atlantic Ocean and Irish Sea to its west. It has an estimated population of three million and the Welsh and English languages are both official languages. The Welsh language is an important element of Welsh culture. Its decline has reversed over recent years, with Welsh speakers estimated to be around 20 per cent of the population of Wales.

General reference 
 Pronunciation: 
 Etymology of "Wales"
 Common English country name(s): Wales
 Official English country name(s): Wales
 Common endonym(s): Cymru  
 Official endonym(s): Cymru  
 Adjectival(s): Welsh
 Demonym(s): Welsh

Geography 

Geography
 Wales is a country that is part of the United Kingdom.
 Location
 Atlantic Ocean
 Northern Hemisphere
 Eurasia (but not on the mainland)
 Europe
 Northern Europe and Western Europe
 British Isles
 Great Britain (the central southern part of the island's western side)
 Several other islands of Wales, the largest being Anglesey
 Extreme points of Wales
 Population of Wales: 2,999,300 (2009 estimate)
 Area of Wales: 
 Atlas of Wales

Environment 

Environment of Wales
 Climate of Wales
 Ecology of Wales
 Renewable energy in Wales
 Geology of Wales
 Protected areas of Wales
 Biosphere reserves in Wales
 National parks of Wales
 AONBs in Wales
 Wildlife of Wales
 Flora of Wales
 Fauna of Wales
 Birds of Wales
 Mammals of Wales

Natural geographic features 
 Islands of Wales
 Lakes of Wales
 Mountains of Wales
 Volcanoes in Wales
 Rivers of Wales
 Waterfalls of Wales
 South Wales Valleys
 World Heritage Sites in Wales

Regions 
Regions of Wales; common models:

Other models exist

Ecoregions 

List of ecoregions in Wales

Administrative divisions 

Administrative divisions of Wales
 Local government in Wales
Cities of Wales
Towns in Wales
Communities of Wales
 Preserved counties of Wales
 Historic counties of Wales

Local government 

Local government in Wales
 Blaenau Gwent
 Bridgend County Borough
 Caerphilly County Borough
 Cardiff
 Carmarthenshire
 Ceredigion
 Conwy County Borough
 Denbighshire
 Flintshire
 Gwynedd
 Isle of Anglesey
 Merthyr Tydfil County Borough
 Monmouthshire
 Neath Port Talbot
 Newport
 Pembrokeshire
 Powys
 Rhondda Cynon Taf
 Swansea
 Torfaen
 Vale of Glamorgan
 Wrexham County Borough

Preserved counties 

Preserved counties of Wales
 Clwyd
 Dyfed
 Gwent
 Gwynedd
 Mid Glamorgan
 Powys
 South Glamorgan
 West Glamorgan

Historic counties 

Historic counties of Wales
 Anglesey
 Brecknockshire
 Cardiganshire
 Caernarfonshire
 Carmarthenshire
 Denbighshire
 Flintshire
 Glamorgan
 Merionethshire
 Monmouthshire
 Montgomeryshire
 Pembrokeshire
 Radnorshire

Former Districts 

Districts of Wales

Cities 

Cities of Wales
 Capital of Wales: Cardiff

Demography 

Demographics of Wales

Government and politics 

Politics of Wales
 Form of government:
 Capital of Wales: Cardiff
 Elections in Wales
 Political parties in Wales
 Welsh nationalism
 Welsh devolution
 Welsh unionism
 Welsh separatism
 Welsh republicanism

Branches of the government 

Government of Wales

Executive 
 Head of government: First Minister of Wales
 Welsh Government
Wales Office (Department of UK Government) – it is primarily responsible for carrying out the few functions remaining with the Secretary of State for Wales that have not been transferred already to the Senedd; and for securing funds for Wales as part of the annual budgetary settlement.
Secretary of State for Wales

Legislative 
Senedd (the Welsh Parliament) (devolved unicameral)

Judicial 
 Supreme Court of the United Kingdom
 Courts of England and Wales

Law and order in Wales 

 English law – the law currently in force in England and Wales.
 Contemporary Welsh Law
 Human rights in Wales
 LGBT rights in Wales
 Law enforcement in Wales
 Medieval Welsh law (historical)

Military 

Military of Wales within the Military of the United Kingdom

 Command
 Commander-in-chief:
 Queen Elizabeth II
 Forces
 British Army
 Royal Navy
 Royal Air Force
 Military history of the United Kingdom
 Military ranks of the United Kingdom

Local government in Wales 

Local government in Wales

History 

History of Wales
 Timeline of Welsh history
 Bibliography of Welsh history
 Current events of Wales

History of Wales, by period 

 List of years in Wales
 Prehistoric Wales
 Wales in the Roman era
 Wales in the Early Middle Ages
 Norman invasion of Wales
 Wales in the Late Middle Ages
 Wales in the Early Modern Era
 Welsh settlement in the Americas
 Modern history of Wales

History of Wales, by region 
 Kingdoms of Wales
 Brycheiniog
 Kingdom of Ceredigion
 Deheubarth
 Kingdom of Dyfed
 Ergyng
 Kingdom of Gwent
 Kingdom of Gwynedd
 Glywysing
 Powys
 Powys Wenwynwyn
 Powys Fadog
 Seisyllwg

History of Wales, by subject 
 List of rulers of Wales
 Medieval Welsh law

Culture 

Culture of Wales
 Cultural relationship between the Welsh and the English
 Architecture of Wales
 Cadw properties
 Castles in Wales
 Cathedrals in Wales
 Country houses in Wales
 Hill forts in Wales
 Listed buildings in Wales
 Monastic houses in Wales
 National Trust properties in Wales
 Cuisine of Wales
 Ethnic minorities in Wales
 Festivals in Wales
 Languages of Wales
 Welsh English
 Welsh language
History of the Welsh language
Welsh placenames
 Media in Wales
 National symbols of Wales
 Coat of arms of Wales
 Flag of Wales
 National anthem of Wales
 People of Wales
 Prostitution in Wales
 Public holidays in Wales
 World Heritage Sites in Wales

Art in Wales 
 Art in Wales
 Cinema of Wales
 Welsh literature
 Welsh-language literature
 Welsh literature in English
 Music of Wales
 Television in Wales
 Theatre in Wales

Religion in Wales 

Religion in Wales
 Buddhism in Wales
 Christianity in Wales
Evangelical Movement of Wales
 Hinduism in Wales
 Islam in Wales
 Judaism in Wales
 Sikhism in Wales

Sport in Wales 

Sport in Wales
 Boxing in Wales
 Cricket in Wales
 Football in Wales
 Rugby league in Wales
 Rugby union in Wales

Economy and infrastructure 

Economy of Wales
 Economic rank (by nominal GDP):
 Agriculture in Wales
 Banking in Wales
 Communications in Wales
 Internet in Wales
 Companies of Wales
 Currency of Wales: Pound Sterling
 Economic history of Wales
 Energy in Wales
 Energy policy of Wales
 Oil industry in Wales
 Health care in Wales
 Mining in Wales
 United Kingdom Stock Exchange
 Tourism in Wales
 Transport in Wales
 Airports in Wales
 Rail transport in Wales
 Roads in Wales
 Water supply and sanitation in Wales
 Welsh Automotive Forum

Education in Wales 

Education in Wales
Primary Education in Wales
Secondary Education in Wales

See also

Wales
 List of basic geography topics

References

External links

Wales
 1